The 1990 Kentucky Derby was the 116th running of the Kentucky Derby. The race took place on May 5, 1990, with 128,257 people in attendance.

Full results

Payout

 $2 Exacta: (7-11) Paid $65.80

References

1990
Kentucky Derby
Derby
Kentucky
Kentucky Derby